Megan Fay Latham (born 24 August 1954) was a judge of the Supreme Court of New South Wales and was the sole Commissioner of the New South Wales Independent Commission Against Corruption from January 2014 to November 2016.

Background and early years
Born in 1954 and raised in the  area of Sydney, Latham was educated at MLC School, in  before matriculating and studying Arts/Law at the University of New South Wales where she graduated in 1979.

Latham was admitted to the New South Wales Bar Association in 1987 and appointed as a Crown Prosecutor, until 1994. In mid-1996, Latham was appointed as the first and only female Crown Advocate of New South Wales.

Judicial career
Latham was sworn in as a NSW District Court judge in August 1998; and as a judge of the NSW Supreme Court in April 2005.

During her time at the Supreme Court, prominent cases included the sentencing of Roger Kingsley Dean, a nurse at the Quakers Hill Nursing Home who pleaded guilty to eleven counts of murder of elderly residents, attributed to arson. Dean was sentenced to life imprisonment without possibility of parole.

Commissioner of the NSW Independent Commission Against Corruption
Following the announcement of the premature retirement of The Honourable David Ipp  due to ill-health in October 2013, Latham was appointed as the nominee to replace Ipp as the sole Commissioner of the NSW Independent Commission Against Corruption and took up her appointment in late January 2014.

In November 2016, Latham informed the Governor of New South Wales that she intended to resign as commissioner effective 30 November, following the state government's overhaul of the commission, which would see three commissioners appointed and would require Latham to re-apply for the role.

Notes

References

External links
 

1954 births
Living people
Judges of the Supreme Court of New South Wales
Australian women judges
University of New South Wales alumni
Australian barristers
Australian solicitors
Judges of the District Court of NSW
20th-century Australian judges
21st-century Australian judges
20th-century women judges
21st-century women judges
20th-century Australian women